Geometric integration can refer to:

Homological integration – a method for extending the notion of integral to manifolds.
Geometric integrator; a numerical method that preserves of geometric properties of the exact flow of a differential equation.
 Geometric integral; several related multiplicative analogues to classical  integration.

Mathematics disambiguation pages